Bracy Herman Bonham Jr. (April 10, 1950 - October 10, 2003) is a former American football player. He played three years of professional football as an offensive guard in the Canadian Football League (CFL) and World Football League (WFL).

Bonham was born in Winston-Salem, North Carolina in 1950 and attended Simon G. Atkins High School in that city. He played college football as an offensive lineman North Carolina Central from 1969 to 1972. 

He began playing professional football in the Canadian Football League in 1973 as an offensive guard for the Toronto Argonauts. He appeared in five CFL games during the 1973 season.

In 1974, he joined the World Football League, playing for the Memphis Southmen during the 1974 season. While principally playing at offensive guard, Bonham requested an opportunity to play at the fullback position and was briefly used in that role. On November 7, 1974, he scored a touchdown on six-yard run -- his first touchdown since junior high school. He was traded to  the Charlotte Hornets in September 1975.

References

1950 births
2003 deaths
Toronto Argonauts players
Memphis Southmen players
Charlotte Hornets (WFL) players
Players of American football from Winston-Salem, North Carolina
Canadian football offensive linemen
American football offensive guards